Euenus (or Evenus) of Paros,, was a 5th-century BC philosopher and poet who was roughly contemporary with Socrates. Euenus is mentioned several times in Plato's Phaedo, Phaedrus, and Apology of Socrates.  He is quoted in Aristotle's Nicomachean Ethics (7.10.1152a32) and Eudemian Ethics (2.7.1223a30). He was apparently, although obscure, well respected, and was never called a Sophist by Socrates, even though he charged a sizeable sum for teaching students.

Sayings
One of his famous sayings is cited twice in: Artemidoros, Oneirocritica 1,15 = Plutarch, Moralia 497A De amore prolis 4: ἢ δέος ἢ λύπη παῖς πατρὶ πάντα χρόνον ("a son is always a terror or a pain for his father.").
"Every thing compelled is by nature grievous", Eudemian Ethics (2.7.1223a30)
Montaigne quotes him to the effect that fire is the spice of life.

Poems
Ten short poetic fragments of Euenus' poetry survive, mostly elegies. One pentameter cited by Aristotle also appears in the Theognidea (v. 472), which is part of a bigger poem (vv. 467-496). This poem is addressed to a Simonides, just as two other poems in the Theognidea: vv. 667-682 & vv. 1341-1350. On this ground, scholars attribute these three poems to Euenus.

Eleven poems in the Palatine Anthology are attributed to "Euenos", of which Anth. Pal. XI. 49 is most probably by Euenus. The others are probably by Euenus of Ascalon, and some may be by Euenus of Athens, Euenus of Sicily or Euenus Grammaticus. Most are about works of art.

See also
Simmias of Thebes

References

Further reading
Plato.  Phaedo, ed. C.J. Rowe
Nails, Debra.  The People of Plato
West,  Iambi et elegi Graeci ante Alexandrum cantati, vol. 1 (1989) & 2 (1992).

Classical Greek philosophers
Epigrammatists of the Greek Anthology
Ancient Parians
Sophists
5th-century BC Greek people
5th-century BC poets
5th-century BC philosophers
Year of birth unknown
Year of death unknown